Becoming Elizabeth is a historical drama series, created by Anya Reiss, that follows the younger years of Queen Elizabeth I. It premiered on Starz on June 12, 2022.

Plot
The series follows the younger years of Queen Elizabeth I, an orphaned teenager who becomes embroiled in the politics of the English court on her journey to secure the crown.

Cast and characters
 Alicia von Rittberg as Elizabeth Tudor
 Romola Garai as Mary Tudor
 Jessica Raine as Catherine Parr
 Tom Cullen as Thomas Seymour
 Bella Ramsey as Lady Jane Grey
 Jamie Parker as John Dudley, 1st Duke of Northumberland
 Oliver Zetterström as King Edward VI
 John Heffernan as Edward Seymour, 1st Duke of Somerset
 Jamie Blackley as Lord Robert Dudley
 Jacob Avery as Lord Guildford Dudley
 Alexandra Gilbreath as Kat Ashley
 Leo Bill as Henry Grey
 Ekow Quartey as Pedro
 Alex Macqueen as Stephen Gardiner
 Olivier Huband as Ambassador Guzman
 Robert Whitelock as Robert Kett
 Ruby Ashbourne Serkis as Amy Robsart

Episodes

Production

Development
In December 2019, it was announced Starz had greenlit an 8-episode series focusing on the younger years of Queen Elizabeth I created by Anya Reiss, who would also serve as an executive producer. In October 2022 it was announced that Starz had cancelled the show and there would be no season 2 covering the reign of Mary I.

Casting
In October 2020, Alicia von Rittberg joined the cast of the series. In May 2021, Romola Garai, Jessica Raine, Tom Cullen, Bella Ramsey, Oliver Zetterström, John Heffernan, Jamie Blackley, Jacob Avery, Alexandra Gilbreath, Leo Bill, Ekow Quartey, Alex Macqueen and Oliver Huband joined the cast of the series.

Filming
Principal photography began in December 2020. In March 2021, production took place at Cardiff Castle.

Reception 
On the review aggregator website Rotten Tomatoes, 88% of 16 critics' reviews are positive, with an average rating of 6.9/10. The website's consensus reads, "Angsty as a disgruntled teenager and all the better for it, Becoming Elizabeth finds fresh drama in the Tudors by shifting focus onto the royal court's web of spiders." Metacritic, which uses a weighted average, assigned a score of 73 out of 100 based on 11 critics, indicating "generally favorable reviews".

References

External links

2020s American drama television series
2020s British drama television series
2022 American television series debuts
2022 American television series endings
2022 British television series debuts
2022 British television series endings
American biographical series
British biographical drama films
Television series by Lionsgate Television
Starz original programming
Cultural depictions of Elizabeth I
Television series about orphans
Television series about teenagers
Television shows filmed in Wales
Cultural depictions of Mary I of England
Cultural depictions of Lady Jane Grey
Cultural depictions of Edward VI of England
Cultural depictions of Lord Guildford Dudley
Television set in Tudor England